LMN is an American architecture firm based in Seattle, Washington. The company was founded in 1979, and provides planning and design services to create convention centers, cultural arts venues, higher education facilities, commercial and mixed-use developments.

History
LMN Architects was founded in 1979 as Loschky, Marquardt and Nesholm by George Henry Loschky (b. 1938), Judsen Robert Marquardt, and John Frank Nesholm (b. 1942), who had all worked for the Seattle architecture firm NBBJ. By 2005, Nesholm was the only remaining original partner, and by 2015, none of the original partners remained.

In 2005, LMN Partners included: John Nesholm, Chris Eseman, Walt Niehoff, Mark Reddington, Rob Widmeyer, and George Shaw; by 2008, Wendy Pautz had joined. By 2015, the partners had become: Shaw, Reddington, Widmeyer, Niehoff, Pautz, John Chau, Rafael Viñoly-Menendez, Sam Miller, and Stephen Van Dyck. By 2017, Widmeyer had left. As of March 2021, the partners consisted of Chau, Miller, Niehoff, Reddington, Shaw, Van Dyck, Viñoly-Menendez, Julie Adams, Osama Quotah, and Pamela Trevithick.

Features
LMN projects have been published in "On the Right Track" in The Architect's Newspaper, as well as in "Vancouver Convention Centre Pushes Limit on Green Design," from Contract Design Magazine, "Advancing Data-Driven Approach to Architecture" in the Metropolis Magazine, and the Seattle Times article on the Seattle Public Library.

Awards
The firm has received over 100 awards in the past 10 years.  Most recently, LMN's work on the Vancouver Convention Centre West was awarded Sustainable Building of the Year from World Architecture News. The firm was also awarded 2012 Regional Firm of the Year by the American Institute of Architects (AIA) Northwest & Pacific Region as well as Chicago Athenaeum American Architecture award. A few other awards the firm has earned are:
 AIA National Cote Award for the Vancouver Convention Centre West
 Sustainable Architecture & Building Magazine Award of Sustainability
 Excellence in Construction Award for the Salem Conference Center
 International Illumination Design Award, Award of Merit for the Marion Oliver McCaw Hall
 Lumen West Award of Excellence for the Marion Oliver McCaw Hall

Notable projects

 2001: Washington State Convention Center expansion, Seattle, Washington
 2003: Marion Oliver McCaw Hall, Seattle, Washington
 2003: Paul G. Allen Center for Computer Science & Engineering University of Washington, Seattle, Washington 
 2006: Duke Energy Convention Center, Cincinnati
 2007: Keegan Hall, Peninsula College, Port Angeles, Washington
 2008: Expedia Building, Bellevue, Washington
 2009: Conrad Prebys Music Center, University of California, San Diego, La Jolla, California 
 2009: ShoWare Center, Kent, Washington
 2009: Vancouver Convention Centre West, Vancouver, BC 
 2010: PACCAR Hall, Foster School of Business University of Washington, Seattle, Washington  
 2014: Tobin Center for the Performing Arts
 2016: Midtown21, Seattle, Washington
 2016: University of Washington station, Seattle, Washington
 2016: Voxman Music Building, University of Iowa, Iowa City, Iowa
 2018: Hyatt Regency Seattle, Seattle, Washington (under construction)
 2020: Seattle Asian Art Museum remodel and expansion, Seattle, Washington

References

External links 

AIA Seattle profile
The 2015 Architect 50: Here are the top firms of the year

Architecture firms based in Washington (state)
Companies based in Seattle
Design companies established in 1979